The 1995–96 season was the 85th season in Hajduk Split’s history and their fifth in the Prva HNL. Their 1st place finish in the 1994–95 season meant it was their 5th successive season playing in the Prva HNL.

Competitions

Overall record

Prva HNL

Classification

First stage

Second stage

Results summary

Results by round

Results by opponent

Source: 1995–96 Croatian First Football League article

Matches

Prva HNL

Source: hajduk.hr

Croatian Football Cup

Source: hajduk.hr

Champions League

Source: hajduk.hr

Player seasonal records

Top scorers

Source: Competitive matches

See also
1995–96 Croatian First Football League
1995–96 Croatian Football Cup

References

External sources
 1995–96 Prva HNL at HRnogomet.com
 1995–96 Croatian Cup at HRnogomet.com
 1995–96 UEFA Champions League at rsssf.com

HNK Hajduk Split seasons
Hajduk Split